Cliff Salmond (27 December 1927 – 25 December 2013) was a Canadian middle-distance runner. He competed in the men's 1500 metres at the 1948 Summer Olympics.

References

1927 births
2013 deaths
Athletes (track and field) at the 1948 Summer Olympics
Canadian male middle-distance runners
Canadian male long-distance runners
Olympic track and field athletes of Canada
Athletes from Victoria, British Columbia